Christmas with McGriff is an album of christmas music by organist Jimmy McGriff recorded and released by Sue Records in 1963.   It charted for one week peaking at #30 on Billboard's Christmas Record Album chart on December 26, 1964.

Track listing 
All compositions by Jimmy McGriff except where noted
 "White Christmas" (Irving Berlin) – 3:14
 "Christmas with McGriff" – 5:52
 "I Saw Mommy Kissing Santa Claus" (Tommie Connor) – 6:35
 "Hip Santa" – 3:05
 "Winter Wonderland" (Felix Bernard, Richard B. Smith) – 5:10
 "Santa Claus Is Comin' to Town" (John Frederick Coots, Haven Gillespie) – 3:33
 "Rudolph the Red-Nosed Reindeer" (Johnny Marks) – 5:04
 "Jingle Bells" (James Lord Pierpont) – 3:34

Personnel 
Jimmy McGriff – organ
Rudolph Johnson – tenor saxophone
Larry Frazier – guitar
Willie "Saint" Jenkins – drums

References 

1963 albums
Jimmy McGriff albums
Sue Records albums
1963 Christmas albums